Loan-deposit ratio (LTD ratio or LDR) is a ratio between the banks total loans and total deposits. The ratio is generally expressed in percentage terms

If the ratio is lower than one, the bank relied on its own deposits to make loans to its customers, without any outside borrowing. If on the other hand the ratio is greater than one, the bank borrowed money which it reloaned at higher rates, rather than relying entirely on its own deposits. Banks may not be earning an optimal return if the ratio is too low. If the ratio is too high, the banks might not have enough liquidity to cover any unforeseen funding requirements or economic crises. Banking analysts commonly used metric for assessing a bank's liquidity.

The LDR is not the only metric used to ascertain a bank's liquidity. Modern banks today have multiple sources of finance beyond equities and deposits. The diversity of financing sources reduces the importance of LDR in determining a bank's health. Basel III which is part of the Basel Accords provides various complementary statistics to measure banking liquidity more comprehensively.

Loans